The Treaty of Fleix (also known as the Edict of Fleix and the Peace of Fleix) was signed on 26 November 1580  by Henry III of France in Le Fleix. Negotiated by François, Duke of Anjou, who wished to focus military efforts on the Netherlands, the accord officially ended the seventh phase of the French Wars of Religion. The agreement, overall, recognized all previous treaties that provided religious privileges to the Huguenots.

See also
List of treaties

External links
Chronology of More Recent Times - 1501 AD to 1600 AD

French Wars of Religion
1580 in France
Fleix
1580 treaties